A working rat is any rat which is trained for specific tasks as a working animal. In many cases, working rats are domesticated brown rats. However, other species, notably the Gambian pouched rat, have also been trained to assist humans.

Domesticated brown rats as working animals
Pet rats derived from Rattus norvegicus, such as fancy rats and laboratory rats, have been trained for various jobs:

Forensics
In the Netherlands, police have begun using brown rats to sniff out gunshot residue. Ed Kraszewski, spokesman for the task force, has said that the rats are easier and cheaper to train than dogs.

Entertainment

Rats have been trained to appear in magic acts, music videos, movies, and television shows. Samantha Martin, a professional animal trainer, has claimed that rats are one of the easiest animals to train due to their adaptability, intelligence, and focus.

Laying computer link cable

By being trained to carry a string through holes in walls, a rat can help economically wire a building for the Internet; afterwards, people use the string to pull the computer link cable through.

As therapy and assistance animals

Domestic rats are used as therapy animals for children with developmental disabilities. Their small size may be less threatening to some children, and therapy centers with limited space can easily house a few rats.

Domestic rats have been trained as service animals, such as to identify damaging muscle spasms for people whose ability to sense this has been compromised by their disability. Dani Moore's service rats are trained to lick her neck when a spasm starts so that she can do stretching exercises or take medication to prevent the spasms from getting out of control. "'The spasms are so intense,' she said, 'that they’ve caused her to break a vertebra in the past.' "   "...Service dogs are not an option because they're too heavy and restless to sit on her shoulder." Non-aggressive, bathed biweekly, and never touching the ground, Dani Moore's rats are rarely even noticed by people when she is out in public; nonetheless, she is understanding of people who have phobias of rats.  However, a fear of rats, just like a fear of dogs, is not a valid reason "for denying access or refusing service to people using service animals.". A video of one of her rats working at his job is available from the AP Archive: Silver the rat helps owner cope with medical condition.

Gambian pouched rats as working animals

A Belgian non-government organization, APOPO, trains Gambian pouched rats (Cricetomys gambianus) to sniff out land mines and tuberculosis. The trained pouched rats are called HeroRATS. Hundreds of thousands of people worldwide commit to "adopt" rats and pay to support them.

References

Working animals
Muroid rodents
Rats